Ivy Hill is a historic home and farm and plantation located in Marriottsville, Howard County, Maryland. 
The property was part of General William Hammond Marriott's property. Marriott would later become Speaker of the Maryland House of Delegates in 1822.
During the Civil War the farm was searched as the potential hiding place of 1st Maryland Infantry, CSA General Bradley Tyler Johnson, who was in the attic at the nearby Mt. Pleasant Farm.

See also
List of Howard County properties in the Maryland Historical Trust

References

Houses completed in 1811
Howard County, Maryland landmarks
Houses in Howard County, Maryland
Buildings and structures in Marriottsville, Maryland
Marriottsville, Maryland